Aseraggodes heemstrai is a species of fish from the genus Aseraggodes. Found in KwaZulu-Natal, South Africa, it was described on the basis of 16 specimens.

References 

Fish described in 2006
Soleidae